Miguel Figueira Damasceno (born 22 April 2000) is a Brazilian professional footballer who plays as a midfielder for Bashundhara Kings in the Bangladesh Premier League.

Career
Figueira made his professional debut with Goiás in a 3–0 Campeonato Brasileiro Série A win over Fluminense on 22 September 2019.

On 14 April 2022, Figueira joined defending  Bangladesh Premier League champions Bashundhara Kings on a 5 month deal.

References

External links
 
 Miguel Figueira at playmakerstats.com

2000 births
Living people
Sportspeople from Amapá
Brazilian footballers
Association football midfielders
Goiás Esporte Clube players
Bashundhara Kings players
Campeonato Brasileiro Série A players